Robert Kehlmann is an artist and writer. He was an early spokesperson for evaluating glass art in the context of contemporary painting and sculpture.  His glasswork has been exhibited worldwide and is the focus of numerous commentaries. Kehlmann's work can be found in museums and private collections in the United States, Europe and Asia.  He has written books, articles, and exhibition reviews for publications in the U.S. and abroad. In 2014 the Rakow Research Library of The Corning Museum of Glass acquired Kehlmann's studio and research archives.

Biography 

Part of a group of California artists making leaded glass panels in the early 1970s, Kehlmann emerged as a key figure in the development of contemporary American stained glass.  Formally trained in literary criticism he was self-taught as an artist. His leaded works, called “Compositions,” together with later mixed media pieces and mosaics, have been described as symbolic, subjective narratives, rendered in a “painterly tradition.”  As an art critic he was a theorist and spokesperson for the contemporary glass movement in the later part of the 20th century.

Kehlmann received National Endowment for the Arts fellowships for his work as both an artist and critic.  He has written two books about glass, and articles and exhibition reviews by him have appeared in periodicals in the U.S. and abroad.  Kehlmann has taught at the Pilchuck Glass School, the California College of the Arts, and the Miasa Bunka Center in Nagano City, Japan.   He has lectured and given workshops at many institutions including the Renwick Gallery, the Corning Museum of Glass, the Victoria and Albert Museum, the Honolulu Academy of Arts and the Rhode Island School of Design.  Kehlmann has juried and curated numerous exhibitions including a retrospective of work by Czech sculptors Stanislav Libenský and Jaroslava Brychtová. He has served on the board of directors of the Glass Art Society (1980–84, 1989–92) and edited the Glass Art Society Journal (1981-1984).

A former Chairman of Berkeley's Landmark’s Preservation Commission (1997-1999), he founded the Berkeley Historical Plaque Project in 1997. Kehlmann has lived and worked in Berkeley California since 1963. His wife, Diana Tosto Kehlmann, is a Jin Shin Jitsu practitioner and a homeopath. Their son, Ephraim, is a digital media producer living in New York City.

Leaded Glass Drawings 

After receiving his master's degree in English Literature, Kehlmann traveled in Europe (1969–70) where he developed an interest in art.  He used the tools of literary criticism to help his understanding: “From the start I felt there was little difference in the experience of reading a poem and that of looking at a painting.”

Kehlmann's early “Compositions” are made with traditional lead came and colored glass.  Glass forms protrude from the background surface, whimsically frolicking with and redefining underlying blocks of color and lead scribbles.  Explaining the absence of transparent glass in these works, he wrote: “I don’t want people looking through my windows.  What lies behind the compositions, aside from a source of light, has no relevance to my design.”  Kehlmann rejected the medium's seductive colors and Tiffany-like approach “plagued” by “small multi-colored pieces of glass,” insisting that the artist has “greater control” with fewer colors and fewer pieces of glass.

His leaded “Compositions” are more akin to paintings or drawings than to traditional stained glass. They have been described as narratives at once “spontaneous, lyric, grotesque and humorous.” Biomorphic forms, quirky lines and childlike scribbles, at times derived from his son's crayon drawings, add to the surreal atmosphere.  A crossed-out triangle in one of the works “appears a casual enough gesture, but the assumption of nearly a thousand years of stained glass, that the nature of line is to delineate shape, is challenged by that childlike scrawl.”   These Compositions “quietly demolished more than a few of the restrictive preconceptions surrounding his media.”

Sandblasted Works 

In the late ‘70s Kehlmann began using sandblast on sheets of hand-blown glass to make “nuanced monochromes” which glow with inner-light trapped in their surfaces.  Perhaps in response to his brother's untimely death in 1982, the exuberance of the early leaded compositions gives way to introspection in two major series: Tablets (1981) and The Stations of the Cross (1982-1995).

In the mid-1980s Kehlmann began using brass and copper etching on the surface of the glass, and charcoal drawings on board behind the glass, to express “free-associative states of mind.”  During a 1984 interview, the late art critic Clement Greenberg singled out Kehlmann's work as taking the “first steps” toward “major art” in “two-dimensional, pictorial” glass.

Kehlmann's mid-career sandblasted works encourage the viewer to enter the depth of the works together with the light. Within layered pieces of glass, or spaces between the glass and underlying drawing, lines and shadows mix with light.  The inner-spaces create changing kinetic pattern and movement as the viewer moves or the light changes.

After traveling in Japan and teaching at the Miasa Bunka center in Nagano City Japan in 1985, the influence of Japanese esthetics and calligraphy emerges prominently in Kehlmann's work.  His pieces of the 1990s and beyond have been called “quiet abstract meditations” making references to the Bible, Buddhism, the natural landscape and Japanese calligraphy.

Kehlmann's “Zen graffiti or Americanized calligraphy,” a mix of bold charcoal gestures and anxious strokes, at times combines with broad areas of gold leaf in the style of the Japanese byōbu.  Other works of the ‘90s were inspired by the northern California coast with light from ripples and bubbles in the hand-blown glass evoking the surface of water, tide pools, and underwater shadows.  They are “characterized by the sensual, measured quality of tender, vulnerable drawn lines in an uncertain planar space.”

Mosaic and Collage 

In his mosaics, as in the sandblasted works, Kehlmann superimposes glass over an underlying drawing.  Irregular spaces between individually hand-cut tesserae and larger abstract glass forms assume a graphic role. They cast shadows that lead the eye of the viewer back and forth between the glass surface and the drawing behind it. The expressive mixed-media collages, containing autobiographical snippets (museum and opera ticket stubs, entries from his father's address cards, fragments of  notated travel maps, etc.) are his most personal works.

Select Public Collections 

 Bank of America World Headquarters, San Francisco, California
 Corning Museum of Glass, Corning, New York
 Four Seasons Hotel, San Francisco, CA
 Glass Museum, Centro de Arte Vitro, Monterrey, Mexico
 Hessisches Landesmuseum, Darmstadt, Germany
 Hokkaido Museum of Modern Art, Sapporo, Japan
 Huntington Museum of Art, Huntington, West Virginia
 International Alcorcon Museo dei Vidreo, Madrid, Spain
 International Glass Museum, Ebeltoft, Denmark
 Leigh Yawkey Woodson Art Museum, Wausau, Wisconsin
 Lincoln Square Residential Lobby (111 W. 67th St.), New York City
 Musée des Arts Décoratifs de la Ville de Lausanne, Switzerland
 Museum für Zeitgenössische Glasmalerei, Langen, Germany
 Museum of Arts and Design, New York
 Oakland Museum, Oakland CA
 Pilchuck School, Stanwood, Washington
 Saint Mary's College, Moraga, CA
 Smithsonian American Art Museum, Washington, D.C.
 Süssmuth-Mitarbeiter-Stiftung Glas-Museum, Immenhausen, Germany
 Toledo Museum of Art, Toledo, Ohio

Notable Exhibitions 

 1976	“Robert Kehlmann: Stained Glass Compositions,” Richmond Art Center, Richmond CA.
 1978   “New Stained Glass,” Museum of Contemporary Crafts, New York (catalog).
 1978   “Robert Kehlmann: Lead and Glass Drawings,” William Sawyer Gallery, San Francisco, CA.
 1979   “New Glass,” Corning Museum of Glass, Corning, NY (catalog).
 1982   “Robert Kehlmann: Works on Glass,” William Sawyer Gallery, San Francisco, CA.
 1982    “World Glass Now ’82,” Hokkaido Museum of Modern Art, Sapporo,  Japan (catalog)
 1983   “Sculptural Glass,” Tucson Museum of Art, Tucson, Arizona. “Stations of the Cross” a series of fourteen sandblasted glass panels exhibited  (catalog).
 1985   “Robert Kehlmann, Neue Glasmalerei,” Galerie M, Kassel and Galerie L, Hamburg, Germany.
 1986   “Robert Kehlmann: New Works with Glass,” William Sawyer Gallery, San Francisco, CA.
 1988, 1990  “Robert Kehlmann,” Anne O’Brien Gallery, Washington, DC.
 1993     “Robert Kehlmann: Drawings with Glass,” Dorothy Weiss Gallery, San Francisco, CA.
 1996     “Robert Kehlmann, Painting with Glass: A Retrospective,” Hearst Art Gallery, Saint Mary's College of California, Moraga, CA. (catalog).

Art Criticism 
As author and curator, Kehlmann became the unofficial theoretician for innovative, non-traditional work in stained glass.  He praised American artists who were forging technical and esthetic innovation while exploring glass as an “autonomous” (as distinct from architectural) medium. A friendly rivalry developed with Robert Sowers, the dean of American stained glass criticism, who argued that stained glass, from its origins, was first and foremost an architectural art. With articles like “Stained Glass as a Non-Architectural Art,” and “Glass as a Free Art Form,” Kehlmann questioned this assumption.  He focused attention on non-architectural stained glass being done by artists like himself who designed and fabricated independent panels during the 1970s and 1980s: Sanford Barnett, Casey Lewis, Paul Marioni, Peter Mollica, Richard Posner and Narcissus Quagliata.

In later writings Kehlmann follows in the footsteps of artist-critic Robert Sowers by developing a new contemporary stained glass aesthetic. Twentieth Century Stained Glass: a New Definition presents an overview of the medium focusing on different 20th Century trends, how they influenced one another, and how they were influenced by other media.

The Inner Light: Sculpture by Stanislav Libenský and Jaroslava Brychtová, a monograph  published in conjunction with the 2002 inaugural exhibition of Tacoma's Museum of Glass, analyzes the artists’ work in the context of Czech Cubism.  Kehlmann's interviews with the artists, which took place shortly before Libenský's death, movingly refer to works cast at the time the artist discovered he had terminal cancer.

As editor of the Glass Art Society Journal, in 1981 Kehlmann founded a well-respected critical and technical journal that continues in publication.

Gallery

References

External links
Robert Kehlmann Collection, Rakow Research Library, The Corning Museum of Glass, Corning, NY. (Retrieved 24 January 2019)

American stained glass artists and manufacturers
Mixed-media artists
Artists from California
Artists from New York City
American contemporary artists
1942 births
Antioch College alumni
University of California, Berkeley alumni
People from Brooklyn
Living people
American male writers